Montenegro competed at the 2016 Summer Olympics in Rio de Janeiro, Brazil, from 5 to 21 August 2016. This was the nation's third consecutive appearance at the Summer Olympics since it gained independence from Serbia in 2006.

Montenegrin Olympic Committee sent a team of 35 athletes, 18 women and 17 men, to compete in seven different sports at the Olympics, matching the nation's roster size with London 2012. Women's handball and men's water polo were the only team-based sports in which Montenegro had representatives at the Games. Among the sports represented by the athletes, Montenegro marked its Olympic debut in tennis.

The Montenegrin team featured a number of returning Olympians; seven of them have attended in every edition of the Games since Montenegro's official debut eight years earlier, including six water polo players, led by captain Predrag Jokić, and half-middleweight judoka Srđan Mrvaljević (men's 81 kg). Meanwhile, handball team captain Bojana Popović, who helped her fellow players deliver a historic silver-medal finish for Montenegro in London four years earlier, became the nation's first ever female athlete to carry the flag in the opening ceremony.

Montenegro narrowly missed an opportunity to add another medal to its Olympic treasury in Rio de Janeiro, as the men's water polo team, led by Jokić, lost to the Italians for the bronze with a score 10–12.

Athletics

Montenegrin athletes have so far achieved qualifying standards in the following athletics events (up to a maximum of 3 athletes in each event):

Track & road events

Field events

Handball

Summary
Key:
 ET – After extra time
 P – Match decided by penalty-shootout.

Women's tournament

The Montenegrin women's handball team qualified for the Olympics by virtue of a top two finish at the second meet of the Olympic Qualification Tournament in Aarhus, Denmark.

Team roster

Group play

Judo

Montenegro has received an invitation from the Tripartite Commission to send a judoka competing in the men's half-middleweight category (81 kg) to the Olympics.

Sailing

Montenegro has qualified one boat in the Laser class through the individual fleet World Championships.

M = Medal race; EL = Eliminated – did not advance into the medal race

Swimming

Montenegro has received a Universality invitation from FINA to send two swimmers (one male and one female) to the Olympics, signifying the nation's return to the sport after an eight-year hiatus.

Tennis

Montenegro has entered one tennis player for the first time into the Olympic tournament. Danka Kovinić (world no. 54) qualified directly for the women's singles as one of the top 56 eligible players in the WTA World Rankings as of June 6, 2016.

Water polo

Summary
Key:
 FT – After full time.
 P – Match decided by penalty-shootout.

Men's tournament

The Montenegro men's water polo team qualified for the Olympics after securing a spot in the final and having attained an automatic berth by virtue of Serbia, as 2015 FINA World League champions, winning the other semifinal at the 2016 European Championships in Belgrade.

Team roster

Group play

Quarterfinal

Semifinal

Bronze medal match

References

External links 
 

Olympics
2016
Nations at the 2016 Summer Olympics